Aaron Hill (born April 23, 1983) is an American actor most famous for his portrayal of "Beaver" on the television show Greek.

Early life 
Hill was born in Santa Clara, California. He started out doing small-time promotional videos for his church in Clovis, California. He is a graduate of Clovis High School.

Career 
Hill began his acting career in 2001 with a guest episode role on The Brothers Garcia. He has since been seen in Mad Men, Malcolm in the Middle, Gilmore Girls, Hannah Montana, CSI: Miami, Breaking Bad, and How I Met Your Mother.

From 2007 to 2011, he was a regular on ABC Family's series Greek , portraying fraternity brother Walter "Beaver" Boudreaux. He made a cameo in Transformers: Revenge of the Fallen.

In 2016, he was featured on House Hunters Renovation along with his wife, Chelsea, looking for a home to fit their growing family.

He stopped acting in front of the camera in 2017 and has transitioned to voice-over work.

Personal life 
He is married to Chelsea and has a child, a daughter named Scarlett, born in 2015. Their son, Wyatt, was born in April 2017. Chelsea is a group fitness instructor.

In April 2021, for April Fools' Day, Hill alluded to a Greek reunion in 2022.

Filmography

References

External links
 

1983 births
Living people
American male television actors
People from Santa Clara, California
Male actors from California
People from Clovis, California